This article lists events that occurred during 1938 in Estonia.

Incumbents
Prime Minister – Kaarel Eenpalu
President – Konstantin Päts

Events
 24 February – election sees National Front winning 63 seats and all the opposition winning 17 seats.
 New Constitution is adopted.
 Estonian Academy of Sciences is founded.

Births
22 March – Rein Etruk, Estonian chess player
24 November – Hando Runnel, Estonian writer

Deaths

References

 
1930s in Estonia
Estonia
Estonia
Years of the 20th century in Estonia